Expobank JSC is a Russian commercial bank headquartered in Moscow. It was founded in 1994 and is a subsidiary of Expobank LLC, which is registered in Cyprus. The bank offers a range of financial services, including corporate and retail banking, investment banking, and asset management.

Activity

The bank has been successfully operating in the market for over 28 years in large corporate, SME, car lending and retail segments. 

Its team has an extensive experience in the implementation of M&A deals and provides advisory support services for complex structured transactions.

History
Expobank was founded in 1994. In 2008, the bank was acquired by Barclays Group and renamed to Barclays Bank LLC.

In 2011, the bank was acquired from Barclays by investors including Igor Kim.  The acquisition of Expobank was recognized as the Deal of the Year 2011 in the M&A market. Early in 2012, the bank was fully rebranded, having back its former name of Expobank LLC.

In September 2012, Expobank acquired 100% of shares in Sibbusinessbank OJSC. In December 2012, Expobank reached an agreement to consolidate assets with CB Stromcombank Ltd. As a result, Stromcombank continued its operations as Expobank's Branch in the Krasnoyarsk Territory.  The merger process was completed in March 2013.

In September 2014, Expobank successfully closed the deal on the acquisition of 100% of shares in German Landesbank Baden-Württemberg's Czech subsidiary, LBBW Bank CZ a.s. The acquiree's rebranding was completed in 2014, with it being renamed to Expobank CZ a.s.

In March 2015, the acquisition of MAK-Bank from ALROSA Diamond Mining Company was announced. The bank merged with Expo in June 2015.

In November 2015, Expobank and Royal Bank of Scotland Group agreed on the acquisition of RBS's subsidiary in Russia, The Royal Bank of Scotland ZAO.  The deal was closed in April 2016. According to EMEA Finance, the acquisition of RBS's subsidiary was recognized as the Deal of the Year 2015.

In December 2017, Expobank completed the deal on the acquisition of JSCB Yapi Kredi Bank Moscow, JSC from Turkish Yapi Kredi Bankasi A.Ş. Yapi Kredi Bank Moscow was the first Turkish bank to appear in Russia: in 1988 as a Representative Office, and in 1993 as a holder of a license from the Bank of Russia. Upon its integration Yapi Kredi Bank Moscow was merged to Expobank in 2018.  
 
In 2019, Expobank came to an agreement with the shareholders of Kurskprombank PJSC on the acquisition of the controlling stake. By that time Kurskprоmbank had been operating in the market for over 29 years and was the biggest bank in Russia's Black Earth region in terms of assets.
In January 2020, Kursprombank was merged to Expobank as the Central Black Earth Region Branch continuing its operations under the Expo brand.

In August 2020, Expobank was the first bank in Russia to extend a loan secured by a digital. asset

In August 2021, Expobank completed its reorganization by transformation into a joint-stock company (JSC) from a limited liability company (LLC). Change of its legal form is aimed at the strengthening of the bank's transparency, ratings, and its further organic growth.

Performance

The bank has around 50 offices in the largest cities: Moscow, St. Petersburg, Novosibirsk, Kemerovo, Kursk, Voronezh, Orel, Bryansk, Nizhny Novgorod, Omsk, Belgorod, Yekaterinburg, Perm, Ufa, Krasnoyarsk, Surgut, Vladivostok, Khabarovsk, Yuzhno-Sakhalinsk.

Ratings

Expo’s high credit ratings (‘ruА-’, Outlook Stable (Expert RA), ‘A-.ru’, Outlook Stable (NKR)) reflect the bank’s financial stability, high return on equity and solid capital adequacy.

References

External links
Official website

Banks of Russia
Russian brands
Banks established in 1994